Andrea Dewar (born July 9, 1979) is a Canadian water polo player.

She is a graduate of McGill University in physical therapy, 2001.

She was part of the bronze medal-winning women's water polo team at the 2001 world championships in Fukuoka, Japan,  2003 World Aquatics Championships, and 2003 Pan American Games.

See also
 List of World Aquatics Championships medalists in water polo

References

External links
 

1979 births
Anglophone Quebec people
Canadian female water polo players
Living people
McGill University Faculty of Science alumni
Olympic water polo players of Canada
People from Pointe-Claire
Water polo people from Quebec
Water polo players at the 2004 Summer Olympics
World Aquatics Championships medalists in water polo
Pan American Games silver medalists for Canada
Pan American Games medalists in water polo
Water polo players at the 2003 Pan American Games
Medalists at the 2003 Pan American Games